The Jade Box (1930) is a Universal movie serial.  It was a partial sound film with long silent sequences.  Only an incomplete version survives today in Universal's vault, with incomplete footage and some missing sound discs.

Plot

John Lamar buys a Jade Box in Asia but it is stolen by his friend Martin Morgan.  A cult, searching for the box because it contains the secret to invisibility, catches up with and abducts Lamar.  After discovering the theft, the cult send a message to Martin and the pair's children: John Lamar's son, Jack, who is engaged to Martin Morgan's daughter, Helen.  Jack searches for the Box while Martin attempts to discover the secret of invisibility for his own schemes.

Cast
Monroe Salisbury as John Lamar, original purchaser of the Box and cult abductee
Jack Perrin as Jack Lamar, John's son & Helen's fiance
Francis Ford as Martin Morgan, false friend of John Lamar
Louise Lorraine as Helen Morgan, Martin's daughter & Jack Lamar's fiance
Wilbur Mack as Edward Haines
Leo White as Percy Winslow
Jay Novello as Bit
Eileen Sedgwick
Frank Lackteen

Critical reception
Cline states that, while The Jade Box is not of a high technical quality, it did show at the time that a mystery serial could be improved by the addition of music and sound effects.

Chapter titles
 The Jade of Jeopardy
 Buried Alive
 The Shadow Man
 The Fatal Prophecy
 The Unseen Death
 The Haunting Shadow
 The Guilty Man
 The Grip of Death
 Out of the Shadows
 The Atonement
Source:

References

External links

The Jade Box at SilentEra

1930 films
1930s fantasy films
American silent serial films
Transitional sound films
American mystery films
American black-and-white films
Universal Pictures film serials
Films directed by Ray Taylor
American fantasy films
1930s mystery films
1930s English-language films
1930s American films
Silent mystery films